The 1972 Miami Dolphins season was the franchise's seventh season and third in the National Football League (NFL). The team was led by third-year head coach Don Shula and achieved the only perfect season in NFL history. They also led the league in both points scored and fewest points allowed.

Starting quarterback Bob Griese broke his ankle in Week 5, leaving backup Earl Morrall to start the remainder of the regular season, though Griese relieved Morrall in the second half of the AFC Championship Game and started Super Bowl VII. Morrall, a thirty-eight-year-old who spent much of his career backing up stars including Griese, Johnny Unitas, and Bobby Layne, was named MVP in 1968 under Shula when the pair led the Baltimore Colts to the NFL championship. The Dolphins clinched the AFC East title in Week 10 with Morrall at quarterback.

Running backs Larry Csonka and Mercury Morris became the first teammates to each rush for 1,000 yards in a season. Paul Warfield led the team in receptions and receiving yards. The offensive line included future Hall of Famers Jim Langer and Larry Little.

The Dolphins' early-1970s defensive unit was termed the "No-Name Defense" by Dallas Cowboys coach Tom Landry given its lack of high-profile players (the unit's only Hall of Famer, linebacker Nick Buoniconti, achieved much of his success with the New England Patriots and was not inducted until 2001). The defense was led by Buoniconti, end Bill Stanfill, tackle Manny Fernandez, and safeties Dick Anderson and Jake Scott. In all, nine Dolphins—Csonka, Morris, Warfield, Little, Norm Evans, Buoniconti, Stanfill, Anderson, and Scott—were selected to the Pro Bowl, and Little, Morrall, Stanfill, and Anderson were named first-team All-Pro.

The Dolphins went 14–0 in the regular season and won all three postseason games to finish 17–0, the only undefeated and untied season in NFL history. Three other teams, the Chicago Bears in 1934 and 1942 and the New England Patriots in 2007, reached the NFL's title game undefeated, but all three lost the championship. Miami led the league in total offense, total defense, scoring offense, and scoring defense, the only team ever to do so. On August 20, 2013, four decades after the perfect season, President Barack Obama hosted the surviving members of the 1972 Dolphins, noting they "never got their White House visit." 50 years later, on October 23, 2022, the 1972 Dolphins were honored at halftime during a Sunday Night Football game featuring the Miami Dolphins and Pittsburgh Steelers, the same matchup that occurred for the 1972 AFC Championship Game. For the 50th anniversary celebration, the Dolphins wore throwback uniforms as well as patches bearing a classic Dolphins logo, the number 50, and the years 1972 and 2022.

The 1972 Dolphins ranked number 1 on the 100 greatest teams of all-time by the NFL on its 100th anniversary.

Background
The Miami Dolphins franchise was founded in 1966 under head coach George Wilson. Wilson led the Dolphins to just fifteen wins in four seasons before being fired and replaced by Baltimore Colts head coach Don Shula. Despite his poor record, many of Wilson's acquisitions contributed to the Dolphins' success in the early 1970s. The team drafted quarterback Bob Griese in 1967, fullback Larry Csonka in 1968, and defensive end Bill Stanfill and running back Mercury Morris in 1969. Wilson also signed Manny Fernandez and traded for Nick Buoniconti, Larry Little, and Paul Warfield. Wilson was initially resentful of the Dolphins' success, believing his firing was premature and Shula had inherited a "ready-made team." However, tension between Wilson and Shula lessened after the team won Super Bowl VII, and Wilson congratulated Shula and invited him to play at his golf course.

After accepting the job in Miami, Shula hired Howard Schnellenberger as offensive coordinator, Bill Arnsparger (who had served as defensive line coach under Shula in Baltimore) as defensive coordinator, Carl Taseff as offensive backs coach, Monte Clark as offensive line coach, and Mike Scarry as defensive line coach, and retained defensive backs coach Tom Keane from Wilson's staff; each of these coaches remained with the team through 1972. In the 1970 draft and ensuing free agency period, Shula added cornerback Tim Foley, safety Jake Scott, guard Bob Kuechenberg, and future Hall of Fame center Jim Langer. In Shula's first season, the Dolphins went 10–4 and reached the playoffs for the first time. Miami returned to the playoffs in 1971 and defeated the Kansas City Chiefs in the longest game in NFL history to secure the franchise's first playoff victory. The Dolphins shut out the Baltimore Colts, Shula's former team, to reach Super Bowl VI, where they lost 24–3 to Dallas.

Off-season

NFL Draft

Roster

Preseason

Regular season

Game summaries

Week 1: at Kansas City Chiefs

The Dolphins opened the season against the Chiefs in the first regular season game at Arrowhead Stadium. In the Divisional Round the year prior, Miami defeated Kansas City at Kansas City Municipal Stadium in double overtime, the longest game in NFL history.

On the Chiefs' first drive, Miami safety Dick Anderson recovered an Ed Podolak fumble, leading to a seven-play, 57-yard drive capped by a 14-yard touchdown from Bob Griese to Marlin Briscoe. Lloyd Mumphord blocked a Jan Stenerud field goal attempt on Kansas City's ensuing drive. Late in the second quarter, the Dolphins scored twice in quick succession – a 47-yard Garo Yepremian field goal and a two-yard Larry Csonka run following an interception by Jake Scott. The Chiefs did not score until a 40-yard field goal by Stenerud late in the third quarter, and a touchdown from Len Dawson to Willie Frazier was the only score of the fourth quarter as Miami won 20–10.

Week 2: vs. Houston Oilers

The Orange Bowl's new Poly-Turf field and intermittent rains led to slippery conditions for Miami's Week 2 meeting with Houston. Less than two minutes in, Bill Stanfill returned a Hoyle Granger fumble to Houston's one-yard line to set up a Jim Kiick touchdown. Minutes later, Houston quarterback Dan Pastorini muffed the ball in punt formation; the Dolphins recovered again and Mercury Morris scored four plays later. Garo Yepremian's subsequent extra point attempt was blocked, his first miss after seventy-five consecutive successful attempts. Miami engineered another four-play scoring drive on its following possession, using a 30-yard Paul Warfield reception to set up a short Larry Csonka touchdown and give the Dolphins a 20–0 halftime lead. Pastorini completed three of ten passes for minus-ten yards in the first half.

A nine-play, 76-yard drive to open the second half pushed Miami further ahead. A long Charlie Joiner touchdown got Houston on the board and a second score after a Morris fumble cut Miami's lead to 27–13. However, Kiick's second touchdown following a fourteen-play drive in the fourth quarter put the game out of reach, and a Tim Foley interception sealed a 34–13 Dolphins victory.

Week 3: at Minnesota Vikings

The first-ever meeting between the Dolphins and Vikings began with a long first-quarter touchdown from Fran Tarkenton to John Gilliam; Minnesota held this 7–0 lead into halftime. Tim Foley intercepted Tarkenton early in the third quarter, setting up a 51-yard Garo Yepremian field goal. A second Yepremian field goal cut Minnesota's lead to one point, but the Vikings responded with thirteen-play drive which ended in a touchdown on the first play of the fourth quarter.

Minnesota quickly regained possession by intercepting Bob Griese, but two sacks of Tarkenton kept Minnesota out of field goal range and the game at 14–6. On Miami's ensuing drive, a 22-yard pass from wide receiver Marlin Briscoe to Jim Mandich set up another 51-yard Yepremian field goal. A short Vikings punt was followed by a six-play Miami drive and a three-yard touchdown pass from Griese to Mandich to give the Dolphins a 16–14 win. The Dolphins sacked Tarkenton five times and intercepted him three times.

Week 4: at New York Jets

The Jets received the opening kickoff and quickly marched 65 yards downfield, taking a 7–0 lead when a Cliff McClain fumble was recovered by guard Randy Rasmussen in the end zone. New York maintained this advantage until early in the second quarter when a 16-yard touchdown pass from Bob Griese to Howard Twilley tied the game. A six-yard Jim Kiick touchdown run gave Miami a 14–7 lead just before halftime.

A field goal early in the third quarter increased Miami's lead to ten points. On New York's subsequent drive, Joe Namath found Jerome Barkum for a 52-yard gain which gave the Jets first-and-goal at the one-yard line. However, two penalties and three failed attempts forced New York to settle for an 18-yard Bobby Howfield field goal, cutting the lead to 17–10. Early in the fourth quarter, Miami capitalized on a long pass interference penalty against Steve Tannen with a second Jim Kiick touchdown run. Miami fumbled a punt deep in its own territory in the fourth quarter and allowed New York cut the lead to 24–17, but a late field goal put the game out of reach as the Dolphins won 27–17.

Week 5: vs. San Diego Chargers

The Dolphins and Chargers traded first-quarter field goals before Dick Anderson returned a fumble 35 yards for a touchdown to give Miami a 10–3 lead. The Dolphins scored a second touchdown on an 18-yard pass from Earl Morrall to Howard Twilley to take a 17–3 lead into halftime. In the third quarter, Morrall's second touchdown pass increased the lead to 24–3. A late San Diego touchdown made the final score 24–10 as the Dolphins moved to 5–0.

Dolphins quarterback Bob Griese broke his ankle early in the first quarter on a sack by Ron East and Deacon Jones. He did not play again for the remainder of the regular season; Griese was replaced by the thirty-eight-year-old Morrall until returning in the AFC Championship Game.

Week 6: vs. Buffalo Bills

The Dolphins remained at home during week 6 for a game against the intradivisional rival Buffalo Bills. Miami scored a touchdown on the opening drive, capped off by a 5-yard run by Mercury Morris. After regaining possession later in the first quarter, the Dolphins managed to reach the Bills 7-yard line. However, four failed attempts at reaching the end zone gave the Bills possession again. Then, in the second quarter, Dolphins running back Jim Kiick fumbled the ball, recovered by Alvin Wyatt of the Bills. This ultimately set up a 35-yard field goal by Buffalo's John Leypoldt. Shortly after, Bills linebacker Ken Lee intercepted a pass from Earl Morrall and returned it for a touchdown. Late in the second quarter, Morrall attempted to throw a lateral pass, but fumbled and Buffalo defensive tackle Don Croft secured the ball. Leypoldt then kicked a 34-yard field goal, allowing the Bills to lead 13–7 at halftime.

Dolphins tackle Manny Fernandez strip-sacked Bills quarterback Dennis Shaw at the Buffalo 10-yard line on the first play of the third quarter. Miami fullback Larry Csonka then ran 10 yards into the end zone, allowing the Dolphins to take a 14–13 lead. A few minutes after this transpired, Dolphins cornerback Curtis Johnson blocked a punt by Spike Jones of the Bills. After the Dolphins were penalized four times on that drive (a loss of 33 yards), Garo Yepremian kicked a 54-yard field goal, the longest in franchise history until Pete Stoyanovich's 59-yard field goal in 1989. The fourth quarter began with a 45-yard field goal by Leypoldt, cutting Miami's lead to 17–16. With 9:18 remaining in the final period, the Dolphins scored again with a 15-yard run by Morris, amassing 106 rushing yards in the game. Later, the Bills capped off a touchdown-scoring drive with a 6-yard pass from quarterback Mike Taliaferro to fullback Jim Braxton. However, with only about one minute remaining by then, the Dolphins won the game by a score of 24–23.

Week 7: at Baltimore Colts

The Dolphins then traveled to Memorial Stadium in Baltimore for a match against the Colts on October 29. Miami scored in the first quarter on an 80-yard drive that included a 20-yard pass from quarterback Earl Morrall to wide receiver Howard Twilley, a 32-yard rush by running back Larry Csonka, a 19-yard rush by running back Mercury Morris, and finally a 1-yard rush by Csonka for a touchdown. Garo Yepremian's extra point allowed the Dolphins to take a 7–0 lead. Dolphins cornerback Curtis Johnson blocked a punt by David Lee of the Colts and recovered the football at Baltimore's 22-yard line. A few plays later, at 3rd and 15 on Baltimore's 27-yard line, Morrall threw the ball to wide receiver Marlin Briscoe, who then threw a pass to wide receiver Paul Warfield at the 1-yard line. Csonka then ran 1-yard for a touchdown, but defensive tackle Jim Bailey blocked Yepremian's extra point attempt.

Later in the second quarter, Dolphins defensive back Lloyd Mumphord blocked Boris Shlapak's field goal attempt. The second quarter then ended after Yepremian kicked a 24-yard field goal. The Dolphins led 16-0 after the first half. The game's final score occurred in the third quarter. Bruce Laird of the Colts was returning a punt but fumbled the ball, which was recovered by Hubert Ginn of the Dolphins at Baltimore's 20 yard line. After a few more plays, Morris scored a 7-yard rushing touchdown, followed by a Yepremian extra point. Miami won the game with a score of 23-0 and improved to 7–0 at the halfway point of the regular season.

Week 8: at Buffalo Bills

For week 8, the Dolphins traveled to War Memorial Stadium in Buffalo to take on the Bills on November 5. A Garo Yepremian 33-yard field goal allowed Miami to take an early 3–0 lead. The Bills then overtook the Dolphins on a drive capped off by quarterback Dennis Shaw throwing a 13-yard pass to running back Randy Jackson, although John Leypoldt's extra point attempt would be blocked. Buffalo now led Miami by a score of 6–3. However, the Dolphins reclaimed the lead on a possession culminating in a 22-yard run by running back Mercury Morris, followed by an extra point by Yepremian. Miami increased their lead further early in the second quarter with a pair of Yepremian field goals from 17 yards and 16 yards. Shortly thereafter, Dolphins quarterback Earl Morrall was intercepted by Bills safety Tony Greene and returned for a touchdown, narrowing Miami's lead to 16–13. This would be the final score of the first half, as Miami halted another scoring attempt by Buffalo when cornerback Tim Foley intercepted Shaw at Miami's 20-yard line.

Miami increased their lead again in the third quarter with a 7-yard pass from Morrall to tight end Marv Fleming. The antecedent drive included several long runs and an unsportsmanlike conduct penalty against the Bills. Later in the third quarter, Leypoldt kicked a 28-yard field goal, cutting their deficit to 23–16 at the end of the period. However, in the fourth quarter, the Dolphins put together another scoring drive that included a 26-yard pass from Morrall to Morris and then 4-yard rush by Morris for the touchdown. With neither team able to accumulate more points after that drive, the game ended as a 30-16 win for the Dolphins. Of note, Morris surpassed 100 rushing yards in a game for only the second time in his professional football career.

Week 9: vs. New England Patriots

Following their win against the Buffalo Bills, the Dolphins hosted the New England Patriots at the Orange Bowl for Week 9. Miami annihilated New England both offensively and defensively. On the third play of the game, Dolphins safety Dick Anderson intercepted Patriots quarterback Jim Plunkett at New England's 26-yard line. Anderson returned the ball to the New England 4-yard line before fumbling. Although it appeared that the Patriots may have recovered the fumble, the officiating crew ruled that they did not. Dolphins running back Mercury Morris then scored a touchdown on a 4-yard rush. On just the fifth offensive play for the Dolphins, Morris again scored a 4-yard rushing touchdown. Miami scored on every possession they had during the first half, leading the Patriots 31–0 at intermission.

In the third quarter, Morrall threw a 16-yard pass to Marlin Briscoe, increasing the Dolphins lead to 38–0. By the beginning of the fourth quarter, with little doubt about which team would win, Dolphins quarterback Jim Del Gazio replaced Morrall. Del Gazio threw two touchdown passes in the final quarter – a 51-yard pass to Briscoe and a 39-yard pass to Jim Mandich. The Dolphins did not allow the Patriots to score throughout the game.

The final score of 52–0 in favor of Miami remains the most lopsided win for either team in the history of the Dolphins–Patriots rivalry. Miami totaled 482 yards, far higher than New England's 169 yards. Morrall passed for 162 yards, while Del Gazio passed for 145. The Dolphins defense limited the Patriots to just 77 net passing yards and 92 rushing yards, including four sacks against Plunkett for a loss of 40 yards. Morris, the leading rusher of the game, accumulated 90 rushing yards and 35 receiving yards; he scored 3 rushing touchdowns. With the victory, the Dolphins improved to 9–0. Don Shula became the 9th head coach in NFL history to win at least 100 regular season games, but the first to do so in only 10 seasons.

Week 10 vs. New York Jets

The Dolphins then returned home in week 10 for their second matchup against the Jets. Near the beginning of the first quarter, Dolphins safety Dick Anderson intercepted Jets quarterback Joe Namath's first pass of that game. After seven more plays, Miami scored on a 9-yard pass from quarterback Earl Morrall to wide receiver Howard Twilley. New York responded with an 80-yard drive that included several short passes from Namath, before eventually ending with a 1-yard rushing touchdown by fullback John Riggins. In the game's second quarter, Morrall fumbled on a lateral pass, with the ball being recovered by cornerback Earlie Thomas of the Jets at the Dolphins 38-yard line. Within a few plays, the Jets scored another touchdown via a 28-yard pass from Namath to wide receiver Rich Caster. New York increased their lead on Miami to 17–7 after Bobby Howfield kicked a 33-yard field goal. However, the Dolphins cut the Jets lead to 17–14 just before halftime on a drive that ended with a 1-yard run by running back Mercury Morris.

Early in the third quarter, Morrall rushed for 31 yards for a touchdown. Miami then led New York by 21–17. The Jets reclaimed the lead later in the third quarter on a drive that ended with a 4-yard pass from Namath to tight end Wayne Stewart. However, in the game's final quarter, Anderson landed on the ball after Jets running back Cliff McClain fumbled it at New York's 27-yard line. On the fourth play after the fumble, Morris managed to run 14 yards to the end zone. Miami would ultimately win the game by a score of 28–24 and improve to 10–0. With the victory, the Dolphins also clinched the AFC East title.

Week 11 vs. St. Louis Cardinals

The Dolphins remained at home at the Orange Bowl in Week 11 for a Monday Night Football game against the St. Louis Cardinals. Dolphins safety Dick Anderson intercepted St. Louis quarterback Gary Cuozzo's first pass of the game at the Cardinals' 29-yard line. On the sixth play following the interception, Dolphins running back Jim Kiick reached the end zone on a 2-yard run. Miami led St. Louis 7–0 following the first quarter. Both teams scored a field goal in the second quarter, from 49-yards and 25-yards by Jim Bakken of the Cardinals and Garo Yepremian of the Dolphins, respectively. At half time, Miami led St. Louis by a score of 10–3.

The Dolphins would widen their lead by two touchdowns in the third quarter. First, Miami scored on a 37-yard pass from quarterback Earl Morrall to wide receiver Otto Stowe. Later in the quarter, Dolphins cornerback Lloyd Mumphord intercepted Cardinals quarterback Jim Hart and returned the ball for a touchdown. Miami now led by 24–3 after the third quarter. St. Louis finally responded again in the fourth quarter via a 2-yard rush by running back Leon Burns. However, the Dolphins then scored another touchdown on a drive capped off by a 27-yard pass from Morrall to Stowe. Miami won the game by a score of 31–10.

Week 12 at New England Patriots

In Week 12, the Dolphins traveled to Schaefer Stadium for their second matchup of the season against the Patriots. The only score in the first quarter was 36-yard field goal by Miami's Garo Yepremian. The Dolphins increased their lead further in the second quarter, with a 10-yard field goal by Yepremian and a 1-yard rush by running back Jim Kiick on a drive that spanned 89 yards. New England responded late in the second quarter via a 36-yard pass from quarterback Jim Plunkett to wide receiver Tom Reynolds. The Dolphins led by a score of 13–7 at halftime.

Early in the third quarter, Miami defensive Vern Den Herder intercepted a pass by Plunkett and reached New England's 11-yard line before the play ended. The Dolphins soon scored another touchdown when quarterback Earl Morrall threw a 3-yard pass to tight end Jim Mandich. Later in the third quarter, Yepremian kicked a 18-yard field goal. Dolphins linebacker Doug Swift intercepted Plunkett on New England's next possession. On the fifth play following the interception, Miami scored on a 14-yard pass from Morrall to wide receiver Marlin Briscoe. Miami added another touchdown early in the fourth quarter via an 8-yard rush by running back Hubert Ginn. At this point, the Dolphins led by 37–7. The Patriots scored two touchdowns in the fourth quarter, the first being an 8-yard pass from quarterback Brian Dowling to running back John Tarver and the second being a 1-yard rush by Dowling. The game ended with a 37–21 victory for the Dolphins.

With the win, the Dolphins became only the third team in NFL history to win at least 12 consecutive games, after the 1934 Chicago Bears and 1969 Minnesota Vikings. Also of note, running back Larry Csonka surpassed 1,000 rushing yards on the season during this game.

Week 13 at New York Giants

The Dolphins traveled to Yankee Stadium in New York to face the New York Giants in Week 13. After Joe Orduna of the Giants returned the opening kickoff for 38 yards, New York began a five play, 50-yard drive. New York running back Ron Johnson rushed 1-yard for a touchdown, which was preceded by a 34-yard pass from quarterback Norm Snead to wide receiver Don Herrmann. However, the Dolphins blocked Pete Gogolak's extra point attempt. Miami quickly responded with a 10 play, 82-yard drive capped off by a 12-yard rush by Mercury Morris for a touchdown and a successful extra point attempt by Garo Yepremian. Later in the first quarter, New York's Rocky Thompson fumbled during a kickoff return, with the ball recovered by Miami running back Charles Leigh. The Giants defense forced the Dolphins to kick a 37-yard field goal, increasing their lead to 10–6.

Miami extended their lead further in the second quarter, when wide receiver Paul Warfield caught a 34-yard pass from quarterback Earl Morrall. New York responded with another touchdown, the result of an 81-yard, 12 play drive which again ended with a 1-yard run by Johnson. By the end of the first half, the Dolphins led by a score of 17–13. Neither team scored in the third quarter. In the fourth quarter, Dolphins cornerback Curtis Johnson intercepted a pass from Snead, which eventually led to Yepremian kicking a 31-yard field goal. A turnover by New York's John Mendenhall during a punt return later in the fourth quarter led to another field goal by Yepremian, this time by a distance of 16 yards. The Giants were unable to score after the second quarter, and thus, the game ended with a 23–13 victory for the Dolphins.

Week 14 vs. Baltimore Colts

 
In the final week of the regular season, the Dolphins returned home for their second matchup against the Colts. The Dolphins scored first, with a 40-yard field goal by Garo Yepremian in the first quarter. Miami extended their lead further in the second quarter, with a 14-yard pass from quarterback Earl Morrall to wide receiver Paul Warfield. After Colts quarterback Marty Domres sprained his ankle, Baltimore briefly inserted Johnny Unitas at quarterback late in the second quarter for what would be his final game as a Colt. In the second half, the Dolphins added six more points with a pair of third and fourth quarter field goals by Yepremian from 50 yards and 35 yards, respectively. Miami Dolphins quarterback Bob Griese entered the game in the fourth quarter, his first time on the field since his injury against the Chargers in Week 5. With Baltimore unable to score throughout the game, Miami won 16–0.

With the Dolphins defeating the Baltimore Colts, they finished the regular season with a perfect win–loss record of 14–0. The 1972 Dolphins became the third team in the history of the NFL to complete a regular season undefeated and untied, after the 1934 and 1942 Chicago Bears, while the 1948 Cleveland Browns achieved a 14–0 record as a member of the All-America Football Conference. Later, the 2007 New England Patriots also earned an undefeated and untied regular season record.

Standings

Postseason

Game summaries

Divisional round: vs. Browns

 
For the first round of the playoffs, the Dolphins remained in Miami to take on the wild card Browns on December 24. The Dolphins scored first, after rookie safety Charlie Babb blocked Browns placekicker Don Cockroft's punt at the Cleveland 17-yard line and returned the ball for a touchdown. Miami added to their lead with a 40-yard field goal by Garo Yepremian near the end of the first quarter, although their offense, ranked the best in the league for the 1972 season, otherwise remained mostly stagnant in the first half. However, Cleveland failed to score in the first half, leaving Miami with a 10–0 at the intermission.

Near the beginning of the third quarter, Browns safety Thom Darden had a significant punt return of 38 yards, which ultimately set up the drive in which Browns quarterback Mike Phipps scored a rushing touchdown. Yepremian then kicked a 46-yard field goal in the opening minutes of the fourth quarter. The Browns orchestrated another touchdown drive in the fourth quarter, ending with a 27-yard pass from Phipps to Fair Hooker. Consequently, the Browns took a 14–13 lead over the Dolphins. However, in the final minutes of the game, Miami executed a six play, 80-yard drive capped by an 8-yard rush by running back Jim Kiick. Throughout the contest, Browns quarterback Phipps was intercepted five times by the Dolphins defense. Miami won by a score of 20–14.

AFC Championship Game: at Steelers

 
Because home teams in the playoffs were decided based on a yearly rotation prior to the 1975 postseason, the Dolphins traveled to Pittsburgh for the AFC Championship Game on December 31 despite being undefeated. The Steelers, who defeated the Raiders in the previous round via the Immaculate Reception, jumped to an early 7–0 lead when Steelers guard Gerry Mullins recovered Terry Bradshaw's fumble in the end zone. In the second quarter, the Steelers defense put the Dolphins in a 4th-and-5 situation at the Pittsburgh 49-yard line. However, Miami instead executed a fake punt in which Larry Seiple ran for 37 yards. Miami then tied the game after Morrall threw a 9-yard pass to Csonka. 

The Steelers retook the lead, 10–7, early in the third quarter when Roy Gerela kicked a 14-yard field goal. Shortly thereafter, Don Shula replaced Morrall with Griese at quarterback. Miami then went on an 80-yard touchdown drive, which featured a 52-yard pass to Paul Warfield and ended with a 2-yard rush by Kiick. After Maulty Moore blocked another Gerela field goal attempt, the Dolphins increased their lead to 21–10 following a 49-yard drive capped by another rush by Kiick, this time by 3 yards. The Steelers responded with a touchdown drive of their own, ending with a 12-yard pass from Bradshaw to Al Young. Although this narrowed the Dolphins lead to 21–17, the Steelers did not score again as the Dolphins intercepted Bradshaw twice in the final minutes of the game. Consequently, Miami remained undefeated and advanced to Super Bowl VII.

Super Bowl VII

 
The Dolphins advanced to their second consecutive Super Bowl appearance, this time against the Washington Redskins at the Los Angeles Memorial Coliseum on January 14, 1973. Washington was favored by 1-point, despite Miami entering the game undefeated and the Redskins having three regular season losses.

Super Bowl VII quickly became a defensive battle between both teams, with the Dolphins and Redskins each starting with two drives that ended with punts. However, in the waning minutes of the first quarter, Miami engineered a scoring drive capped by a 28-yard touchdown pass from Griese to Twilley. On Washington's subsequent drive, Jake Scott intercepted Billy Kilmer's pass. But the Dolphins failed to capitalize and both teams exchanged punts, while Kilmer threw another interception to Nick Buoniconti, who then returned the ball for 32 yards, with two minutes remaining in the half. Miami took advantage this time and scored on a 1-yard rush by Kiick. The Dolphins held a 14–0 lead at halftime.

On the opening drive of the third quarter, the Redskins advanced as far as the Dolphins 17-yard line, before Manny Fernandez sacked Kilmer on third down for a loss of 8-yards. Curt Knight's subsequent field goal attempt of 32 yards missed. The game then continued to be a defensive battle between the two teams. Both teams then exchanged punts again, while Griese was intercepted by Brig Owens late in the third quarter. Just over halfway through the fourth quarter, the Redskins again drove far into Dolphins territory. However, Scott intercepted another pass from Kilmer. Subsequently, Miami's next drive stalled at Washington's 34-yard line. Redskins defensive lineman Bill Brundige blocked Yepremian's 42-yard field goal attempt. Yepremian then tried to throw a pass, but the ball was instead caught by Washington cornerback Mike Bass, who ran the other way to cut the Dolphins lead to 14–7. This play is sometimes referred to as "Garo's Gaffe". Both teams each had one more drive, but neither of them resulted in a score. Thus, Dolphins won Super Bowl VII by a score of 14–7.

Awards and honors
 Coach of the Year – Don Shula
 Comeback Player of the Year – Earl Morrall
 Super Bowl Most Valuable Player – Jake Scott

Urban legend
There is an urban legend that every season, whenever the last remaining undefeated NFL team loses its first game, all the surviving members of the 1972 Miami Dolphins open bottles of champagne in celebration. Coach Don Shula tried to play down the myth by saying that two players, Dick Anderson and Nick Buoniconti, who live near each other, sometimes have a toast together. However, they occasionally had Diet Cokes together, such as in 2005 when Bob Griese and Shula watched the Chargers win over the Colts, the last undefeated team that season. 

The NFL capitalized on the legend during a commercial that aired during Super Bowl LIII commemorating the 100th year of the NFL. The commercial featured "44 of the greatest NFL athletes" at a formal dinner event with the attendees dressed in black tie. Cacophony breaks out, and three members of the 1972 Dolphins, Larry Little, Paul Warfield, Larry Csonka, are shown casually sitting at a table together uniquely dressed in aqua-colored formal coats, and all three are drinking champagne, laughing at the chaos happening around them.

The perfect season

The 1972 Miami Dolphins were the first team to execute a perfect regular season in the post-merger NFL. They are the only team in NFL history to go undefeated and untied in the regular season and postseason.

After their loss to the Dallas Cowboys in Super Bowl VI (Miami's only loss during calendar year 1972), Don Shula had vowed to not only reach the Super Bowl again but to win it. He forced the team to watch film of the loss twice while at training camp. Shula would later go on to say: 

An enduring controversy is based on the argument that the 1972 Dolphins played a soft schedule not possible under the current scheduling formula. Prior to the implementation of position scheduling in 1978, opponents were set by the NFL on a rotating basis. The Dolphins’ 1972 regular-season opponents posted an aggregate winning percentage of .397, and only two had winning records for that season (both the Kansas City Chiefs and New York Giants finished 8–6). However, this does not constitute any record; the 1975 Minnesota Vikings, who began 10–0 and finished 12–2, played 14 opponents with an average winning percentage of .332, and nine of their games were against teams 4–10 or worse.

The Dolphins were beneficiaries of a weak AFC East that saw the Colts lapse from a perennial contender into a three-year stretch in which they would win only 11 games; a Bills team yet to find its legs with O. J. Simpson and the return of coach Lou Saban; a dysfunctional Patriots organization that had little to no talent to surround former No. 1 overall draft choice Jim Plunkett; and a Jets squad with a porous defense, offsetting the benefits of Joe Namath remaining healthy throughout the season and an emerging John Riggins in the running game. Miami also caught a scheduling break by facing an Oilers team that was in the midst of back-to-back 1–13 seasons, a Chargers team beginning a run of four consecutive seasons in the AFC West cellar, and a Cardinals team that appeared to lack direction by rotating its starting quarterbacks instead of giving the job full-time to Jim Hart. The Dolphins also caught the Vikings in the midst of a massive transformation following the return of Fran Tarkenton, missing the playoffs for the only time between 1968 and 1978, finishing 7–7.

The NFL's rules at the time forced the undefeated Dolphins (14–0) to play the Steelers (11–3) in Pittsburgh for the AFC Championship Game. Subsequent rule changes have since changed the playoff structure so that this would never happen again. Since the 1975 season, teams that have won their division and have had a superior record than their opponent (as was the case with the 1972 Dolphins when they faced the Steelers) would play their postseason games at home.

The 1972 Dolphins consisted mostly of the same core of players that it possessed from 1970 through 1974 and was the most dominant NFL team during that stretch. In those five seasons, the Dolphins reached the playoffs all five years, won three AFC Championships, two Super Bowls and went undefeated and untied while winning the Super Bowl in 1972. They posted a record of 65–15–1, and were also the fastest franchise to win a Super Bowl after franchise inception and joining the NFL (seven years after starting in the AFL, three years after becoming a member of the NFL).

Television coverage
Fans in the Miami area could not view the team's home games on television, as 1972 was the final year in which all NFL home games were blacked out on local television even if the stadium had sold out. To view the team's home games, Dolphins fans in the Miami-Dade area would have to attend home games in person or travel to outside markets such as Orlando, Tampa and Jacksonville to watch the games on television.

Super Bowl VII was the first game to be televised in the market of origin under new rules that would come into effect the following season requiring games to be sold out within 72 hours of kickoff time to be aired in the market of origin (these blackout rules were lifted in 2015). As all Super Bowls (except Super Bowl I) have sold out, none have been blacked out since.

President Richard Nixon, many of his White House staff, and members of Congress were angered by the blackout rules, as they could not watch the home games of the Dolphins’ eventual Super Bowl opponent, the Redskins, even though all games at RFK Stadium had been sold out since 1966.

2013 White House visit

Four decades later, on August 20, 2013, the team was invited by President Barack Obama to visit the White House. Obama noted that the team "never got their White House visit." Asked why the team had not been invited by President Richard Nixon in 1973, Larry Csonka stated that he did not feel neglected as it had not been a regular occurrence at the time. However, MSNBC reported that this was a deliberate snub by Nixon, who was a Redskins fan, even though Nixon owned a vacation home in nearby Key Biscayne, Florida and telephoned Shula only hours after the Dolphins defeated the Colts in the 1971 AFC Championship game to suggest a play for Miami to use in Super Bowl VI (a down-and-out pass to Warfield that was broken up by Cowboys safety Cornell Green). Obama had previously invited the 1985 Bears to the White House, as their original visit had been canceled because of the Space Shuttle Challenger disaster. Obama, a Chicago resident and Bears fan, had called the 1985 Bears the greatest team ever, but during the Dolphins' visit, he called his own words into question, also noting that the 1985 Bears' only defeat came at the hands of the Dolphins. Bob Kuechenberg, Jim Langer, and Manny Fernandez all refused to attend because of their political differences with the Obama administration.

References

External links
 1972 Miami Dolphins Season at Pro-Football Reference
 Perfect Season Podcast – a 50th anniversary podcast with an episode for each game of the 1972 season, starring several members of the team 

Miami
Miami Dolphins seasons
AFC East championship seasons
American Football Conference championship seasons
Super Bowl champion seasons
Miami Dolphins